Dino Islamović (born 17 January 1994) is a Montenegrin professional footballer who plays for Gangwon FC as a striker. Islamović formerly represented Sweden internationally, but currently represents the Montenegro national football team.

Club career

He started his career at Swedish side Malmö FF before spending two seasons with English side Fulham.

He joined Dutch Eredivisie side FC Groningen in June 2014 making his team debut at 17 July 2014 in a UEFA Europa League qualifying round fixture against Aberdeen when he replaced Nick van der Velden after 82 minutes in a goalless draw at the Pittodrie Stadium. At Groningen he won the KNVB Cup in the 2014–15 season after they beat PEC Zwolle 2–0 in the final.

He returned to Sweden after five years, when he joined Trelleborgs FF from FC Groningen in 2017, where he spent one season before joining Östersunds FK in January 2018. He scored on his debut against his former club in the Svenska Cupen on 9 February 2018.

Islamović played as a second-half substitute for Östersunds as they beat Arsenal in the 2nd leg of the Europa League last 32 at the Emirates Stadium with a 2–1 victory on 22 February 2018 after goals from Hosam Aiesh and Ken Sema. However they were knocked out on aggregate 4–2.

30 December 2019, Islamović signed for Rosenborg on a 3-year contract.

In February 2022, he joined Gangwon FC of South Korean K League 1.

International career

Sweden
Born in Sweden, Islamović is of Montenegrin and Bosnian descent. He has represented Sweden at international level up until Sweden U21's.

Islamović made his international debut for Sweden in a non-FIFA friendly match against Moldova on 9 January 2020.

Montenegro
On 5 March 2020, Islamović announced that he would switch international allegiances to the Montenegro national football team.
Six months later, on 5 September 2020, he made his international debut against Cyprus. That game finished in a 2–0 victory for Montenegro.

Career statistics

Club

References

External links 
 
 
 
   

1994 births
Living people
People from Hudiksvall Municipality
Swedish people of Montenegrin descent
Swedish people of Bosnia and Herzegovina descent
Bosniaks of Montenegro
Association football forwards
Swedish footballers
Sweden youth international footballers
Sweden under-21 international footballers
Sweden international footballers
Montenegrin footballers
Montenegro international footballers
Dual internationalists (football)
FC Groningen players
Trelleborgs FF players
Östersunds FK players
Rosenborg BK players
Eredivisie players
Superettan players
Allsvenskan players
Eliteserien players
Montenegrin expatriate footballers
Swedish expatriate footballers
Expatriate footballers in the Netherlands
Montenegrin expatriate sportspeople in the Netherlands
Swedish expatriate sportspeople in the Netherlands
Expatriate footballers in Norway
Montenegrin expatriate sportspeople in Norway
Swedish expatriate sportspeople in Norway
Sportspeople from Gävleborg County